Witness Against the Beast: William Blake and the Moral Law is a 1993 book by the British historian E. P. Thompson in which Thompson contextualizes the work of the otherwise enigmatic poet and painter William Blake. The last book that Thompson would write, it was published posthumously. The book attempts to frame some of Blake's ideas in the traditions of the culture of religious dissent in England.

See also
The Making of the English Working Class

References
Leader, Zachary. (5 December 1993) BOOK REVIEW / A meeting with the last of the Muggletonians: Witness against the beast: William Blake and the Moral Law – by E P Thompson, Cambridge pounds 17.95 The Independent. Retrieved 4 August 2009
Holmes, Richard (12 May 1994) Lord of Unreason The New York Review of Books. Retrieved 4 August 2009

External links
Overview with excerpts from Google Books

Works about William Blake
1993 non-fiction books
Biographies about writers
Cambridge University Press books